The 1995 Charlotte Rage season was the fourth season for the Charlotte Rage. They finished the 1995 Arena Football League season 5–7 and were one of three teams in the National Conference to miss the playoffs.

Regular season

Schedule

Standings

Awards

References

Charlotte Rage seasons
1995 Arena Football League season
Charlotte Rage Season, 1995